Jirón may refer to:

People
 Carlos Jirón (1955-2020), Nicaraguan politician.
 Pedro Jirón (1939-2018), Nicaraguan footballer.

Places
 Jirón de la Unión, pedestrian street located in Lima, Peru.